Clarissa Britain (1816–1895), was a 19th-century American inventor who received seven patents in a span of 18 months from early 1863 to 1864. Professionally, she was trained as a school teacher and was the founder and principal of Niles Female Seminary in Niles, Michigan.

Early life 
Clarissa was born in Brownville, New York into a prominent, middle class family. Her father, Calvin Britain was a Major-General in the War of 1812. Her brother Calvin Britain, was one of the original settlers of St. Joseph, Michigan laying out the plat of the original village and who went on to be a prominent politician in Michigan.

Because of her socioeconomic position, Clarissa received a good education and was able to have a career as a teacher. She taught for several years in district schools near her home in Brownville. From 1838  to 1839 she attended Emma Willard's Troy Female Seminary. After her year in Troy, New York Clarissa took a position as assistant at a seminary school in Washington, Pennsylvania.

This was the start of Clarissa's journey around the United States. She lived in at least seven different states during her lifetime which was unusual for a woman of her time period. Her family was the main reason for her transitory lifestyle.

Professional life 
In 1841, Clarissa moved to Niles, Michigan to be closer to her brother Calvin and to also establish her own school, Niles Female Seminary which she was the principal until 1848 when she sold the school. Clarissa moved back to Troy and taught for three years at Troy Seminary. She then moved to Beaufort, South Carolina to be closer to her sister, Martha Johnston. It is not known where she taught while she lived in South Carolina but appears that she left Beaufort and spent several years as vice principal at a school in Wheeling, West Virginia before returning to Beaufort.

It was while she was still in Beaufort the second time that the South seceded from the North in 1860. Clarissa lived only six miles away from the Battle of Port Royal in 1861. In 1862, her brother, Calvin died and she traveled back to St. Joseph, Michigan to settle his estate. It is unclear how she made her way back to Michigan but she more than likely came in close contact with the fighting during the American Civil War.

Inventions 

In 1863 after settling her brother's affairs, Clarissa's professional life turned from teaching to inventions. It is not known why she did this. It can be surmised that perhaps what she saw in her journey north inspired her to create some of her inventions or perhaps she was looking for another way to make a living. Regardless, in the short span of a year and a half, Clarissa applied for and received seven patents. One of her patents was for an ambulance improvement to help with the removal of the wounded and bodies from the battlefield. Several others were for cooking improvements and one for a dinner pail for miners (Patent No. US41,274) which included a light, a food warming mechanism, and eating utensils.

Formative years 
After trying her hand at invention, Clarissa moved to Kenosha, Wisconsin where she worked as the principal at  Kemper Hall for a year in 1866 before returning to South Carolina to take care of her sister's seven children after their mother died. She then moved to Chicago in 1870 with the children and their father to focus on raising her sister's children. It appears she lived in Chicago for a number of years, before returning to St. Joseph, Michigan to live her sister, Isabella. According to the 1880 census she listed her occupation as retired teacher.

Clarissa made one more move to Baton Rouge, Louisiana for reasons not recorded. She died in Baton Rouge in 1895 at the age of 80. 

It doesn't look like Clarissa was ever able to sell the rights to any of her inventions and her obituary never mentions her inventor career.

References 

19th-century American inventors
Women inventors
1816 births
1895 deaths